Piet Haan (19 November 1930 – 22 July 2017) was a Dutch racing cyclist. He rode in the 1955 Tour de France.

Major results
1953
 5th Züri-Metzgete
1954
 5th Overall Tour of the Netherlands
1955
 1st Overall Tour of the Netherlands
1st Stage 4a
 1st Stage 1b (TTT) Tour de France

References

External links
 

1930 births
2017 deaths
Dutch male cyclists
Sportspeople from Mechelen
Cyclists from Antwerp Province
20th-century Dutch people